Rietavas Municipality is one of 60 municipalities in Lithuania.

According to the 2021 Lithuanian census, Rietavas Municipality had the highest fertility rate in Lithuania - with an average of 2.019 children per woman. This is 34% higher than the national average of just 1.506 children per woman.

References

 
Municipalities of Lithuania